Bob "Nails" Carmichael (4 July 1940 – 18 November 2003) was an Australian tennis player and coach.

As a player, Carmichael won one singles title and 12 doubles titles, and achieved a top-ten ranking in 1970. Partnering Allan Stone, he reached the doubles final of the 1975 Australian Open.

Following his retirement in 1979, Carmichael was a coach for Tennis Australia, and the Australian Institute of Sport. He coached top-ranking professionals Patrick Rafter, Lleyton Hewitt, Darren Cahill and Leander Paes.

Career finals

Doubles (12 titles, 22 runner-ups)

References

External links
 
 
 

1940 births
2003 deaths
Australian male tennis players
Australian tennis coaches
Australian Institute of Sport coaches
Tennis players from Melbourne